Kavidi Ishadika Sirimannage (born 27 September 1995) is a Sri Lankan badminton player. In 2010, she won the mixed doubles title at the Sri Lanka Air Force Championships with Niluka Karunaratne. In 2015, she was crowned as the champion in the women's doubles, and the runner-up in the singles and mixed doubles. In 2016 she helped the Sri Lankan women's team win a silver medal at the South Asian Games, and also won a bronze in the singles and the mixed doubles event. She won the 2017 Summer Season Championships in the women's doubles event with Thilini Hendahewa, and was the runner-up in the singles. She won her first international title at the Lagos International tournament in the women's doubles event with Hendahewa. She competed at the 2017 Summer Universiade in Taipei, Taiwan, and at the 2018 Commonwealth Games in Gold Coast.

Achievements

South Asian Games 
Women's singles

Women's doubles

Mixed doubles

BWF International Challenge/Series (2 titles, 3 runners-up) 
Women's doubles

Mixed doubles

  BWF International Challenge tournament
  BWF International Series tournament

References

External links 
 
 Profile at www.2017.taipei

Living people
1995 births
Sportspeople from Colombo
Sri Lankan female badminton players
Badminton players at the 2018 Commonwealth Games
Commonwealth Games competitors for Sri Lanka
Badminton players at the 2018 Asian Games
Asian Games competitors for Sri Lanka
South Asian Games gold medalists for Sri Lanka
South Asian Games silver medalists for Sri Lanka
South Asian Games bronze medalists for Sri Lanka
South Asian Games medalists in badminton